Indicator Island is an island  long, lying  west of the northwest end of Galindez Island in the Argentine Islands, Wilhelm Archipelago, Antarctica. It was charted and named in 1935 by the British Graham Land Expedition under John Rymill. A windsock was erected on this island by the expedition to indicate wind direction for the expedition's airplane.

See also 
 List of Antarctic and sub-Antarctic islands

References

Islands of the Wilhelm Archipelago